Zoé Félix (born 7 May 1976) is a French actress.

Biography

Acting career
When Félix was seventeen, an agent saw her on a bus, gave her his card, and asked her to call him if she was ever interested in acting. Two years later, she contacted the agent to find small acting jobs to finance her studies at the Beaux-Arts, which she attended for two years.

Movie
In 1998, she got her first film acting experience in Olivier Dahan 's Déjà mort.  She portrayed Carole in the French horror thriller Captifs. In 2008, she played Julie in the Dany Boon film Bienvenue chez les Ch'tis, an enormous success in France.

Personal life
Félix's mother works in public relations for the fashion industry, and her father organizes concerts. She is married to Benjamin, the director of a Parisian bar, Le Rosie.

References

External links

1976 births
French film actresses
Living people
Actresses from Paris
French television actresses
21st-century French actresses